The Rock edicts of Khalsi, also spelled Kalsi, are a group of an Indian rock inscriptions written by the Indian Emperor Ashoka around 250 BCE. They contain some of the most important of the Edicts of Ashoka. The inscription in Khalsi contains all the Major Rock Edicts, from 1 to 14. They were discovered in Khalsi, a village in Uttarakhand, northern India, by Alexander Cunningham about 1850.

The inscription
The Rock edicts of Khalsi are among the many inscriptions of Ashoka, the first being the Bilingual inscription of Kandahar, written in Greek and in Aramaic, in the year 10 of his reign. The other inscriptions of Ashoka are in Indian language (various forms of Prakrits) with the exception of the Kandahar Greek Edict of Ashoka, and were only published from around 3 to 4 years later, and until 27 years after his coronation.  

The Khalsi edicts, placed in North-Western India, were located near the Hellenistic world represented by the Greco-Bactrian Kingdom and its capital Ai Khanoum. The language of these edicts is Pali and the script is Brahmi.
 
The inscriptions were written on a solid quartz rock. The main face (east face) of the rock contains Edicts 1 to 12 and the first part of Edict 13. On the right side (north face) is the drawing of an elephant with the word in Brahmi Gajatama, of uncertain meaning, possibly "Supreme Elephant". On the left side (south face) is the continuation of the inscription started on the main face, with the second part of Edict 13 and Edict 14.

This last edict, Edict No.13, is particularly important in that it mentions the main Hellenistic kings of the time, as well as their precise geographical location, suggesting that Ashoka had a very good understanding of the Greek world of the time. It is also this inscription which made it possible to date the reign of Ashoka with a certain precision, between 260 and 230 BCE. This Edict also appears, although in a less well preserved form, in the Girnar inscription, and very damaged in the Mansehra inscription.

Edict 13 refers in particular to contemporary rulers of the Hellenistic period, who had inherited the conquests of Alexander the Great. Its mentions Antiochos II, Ptolemy II, Antigonos II Gonatas, Magas of Cyrene and Alexander II of Epirus.

Some scholars believe that Buddhist communities have emerged in the Hellenistic world following Ashoka's reign, notably in Alexandria (this community being mentioned four centuries later by Clement of Alexandria). Given Ashoka's particularly moral definition of "Dharma" it is possible that he simply wants to say that virtue and piety now exist from the Mediterranean to the south of India. An expansion of Buddhism to the West is unconfirmed historically. In other inscriptions, Ashoka also states that he sent emissaries to the West to transmit medical care and medicinal plants (Major Rock Edict No.2). We do not know what the influence of these emissaries was on the Greek world.

Stamping
The inscriptions have been remarkably stamped and published by E. Hultzsch in "Inscriptions Of Asoka", the full text of which is available online.

Relation to Greek philosophy
According to Valeri Yailenko, the Kineas inscription of Ai Khanoum, dated about 300 BCE, probably influenced the writing of the Edicts of Ashoka a few decades later, around 260 BCE (see also Hellenistic influence on Indian art). The edicts put forward moral rules which are extremely close to the Kinéas inscription of Ai Khanoum, both in terms of content and formulation. Short, aphoristic expressions, the subjects being discussed, the vocabulary itself, are all elements of similarity with the inscription of Kineas.

References

Sources
 Valeri P. Yailenko, Aï Khanoum's delphic maxims and the formation of the Asoka dharma doctrine, Dialogues d'histoire ancienne, volume 16, number 1, 1990, 239-256

External links

 Full text of the inscription of Khalsi

Archaeological sites in India
Inscribed rocks
Edicts of Ashoka